The following is a list of fixtures and results of the Philippines men's national ice hockey team against other national teams as well as foreign club sides. This also includes matches against Philippine-based clubs in tournaments also featuring foreign-based teams.

Fixtures and results

Against national teams

Against club and other teams

All-time record against other nations
Last match update: 6 March 2019

References

Ice hockey in the Philippines
Ice hockey statistics